Khozraschet (short for   'economic accounting') was an attempt to simulate the capitalist concepts of profit and profit center into the planned economy of the Soviet Union.

Meaning 
The term has often been translated as cost accounting, a term more typically used for a management approach in a free market economy. It has also been conflated with other notions of self-financing, cost-effectiveness, and self-management introduced in the state-owned enterprises in the 1980s.

As defined in the Soviet Encyclopedic Dictionary:

History 
 introduced the necessity in accountability and profitability as well as the motivation in thrifty expenditures. The notion was introduced during Lenin's New Economic Policy (NEP) period. However, the notion of "profitability" tended to favor light industry over heavy industry, which was hindered on the pretext of "poor profitability". Since the priority in development of heavy industry and capital goods to ensure fast modernisation of the Soviet Union was among the major sciences of the Marxist–Leninist application of Marxist economics to the Russian situation, by the end of the 1920s the notion of economic profitability was subordinated to the demands of an economic plan, which in its turn was put into a direct dependence on political decisions and whose "control figures" were turned from guidelines into obligatory targets expressed in the series of Five-Year Plans.

The notion re-emerged during the 1965 Soviet economic reform and was later greatly emphasized in the late 1980s during  when it also implied workers' self-management. A first timid opening to private activity took place in 1986, with a law which allowed the private management of less than a dozen handicraft and service businesses, with unpaid and family labour, strict controls by the state and tax rates of 65% (later lowered in 1988).

Notes

References 

Reform in the Soviet Union
Costs
Economy of the Soviet Union
Profit
Mikhail Gorbachev
Political catchphrases
Soviet phraseology
1980s in the Soviet Union